The 1950 San Francisco Dons football team was an American football team that represented the University of San Francisco as an independent during the 1950 college football season. In their third season under head coach Joe Kuharich, the Dons compiled a 7–4 record and outscored their opponents by a combined total of 291 to 181.

Schedule

References

San Francisco
San Francisco Dons football seasons
San Francisco Dons football